2nd ZAI Awards

Presenter  Union of Authors and Performers 

Broadcaster STV 

Grand Prix Pavol Hammel

◄ 1st │ 3rd ►

The 2nd ZAI Awards, honoring the best in the Slovak music industry for individual achievements for the year of 1991, took place and time in Bratislava in 1992.

Winners

Main categories

Others

References

External links
 ZAI Awards > Winners (Official site)

02
Zai Awards
1991 music awards